Nils Bertil Rikberg (29 March 1928 in Pernå – 10 August 2002 in Turku) was a Finnish footballer who competed in the 1952 Summer Olympics. He became one of the first professional footballers of Finland when he transferred to France in 1953.

References

 

1928 births
2002 deaths
Finnish footballers
Finland international footballers
Olympic footballers of Finland
Footballers at the 1952 Summer Olympics
Toulouse FC (1937) players
FC Sète 34 players
Ligue 1 players
Ligue 2 players
Expatriate footballers in France
Swedish-speaking Finns
Åbo IFK players
Association football forwards
People from Pernå
Sportspeople from Uusimaa